Barton Ward, representing the village of Barton Seagrave, is a 2-member ward within Kettering Borough Council. The ward was last fought at Borough Council level in the 2007 local council elections, in which both seats were won by the Conservatives.

The current councillors are Cllr. Christopher Lamb and Cllr. Russell Roberts.

Councillors
Kettering Borough Council Elections 2007
Christopher Lamb (Conservative)
Russell Roberts (Conservative)

Current Ward Boundaries (2007-)

Kettering Borough Council Elections 2007
Note: due to boundary changes, vote changes listed below are based on notional results.

Previous ward boundaries (1999-2007)

Kettering Borough Council Elections 2003

(Vote count shown is ward average)

See also
Kettering
Kettering Borough Council

Electoral wards in Kettering